Roberto de la Cruz (born November 21, 1941 in Baguio, Philippine Commonwealth) is a Filipino former professional boxer. Cruz won the WBA World Light Welterweight title in a career that spanned from 1955 to 1968.

Early life
Roberto Cruz was born on November 21, 1941, in Baguio, Philippines.

Professional career
Cruz made his professional debut on February 10, 1955, losing to Laureano Llarenas via a four round points decision. It took until his third fight to achieve his first victory, beating Peping Cortez with a third round knockout. Cruz's first title success came on October 1, 1959 when he beat Leo Espinosa over twelve rounds for the Philippines Games & Amusement Board (GAB) Featherweight title. Over the next three years Cruz also won the GAB Welterweight title but also suffered five defeats in non-title bouts.

On March 21, 1963 Cruz fought outside the Philippines for the first time as he travelled to the United States to fight the Mexican boxer Battling Torres for the vacant WBA Light Welterweight title. The fight took place at Dodger Stadium, Los Angeles as part of a title triple-header which also featured; Emile Griffith vs Luis Manuel Rodriguez at welterweight and Sugar Ramos vs Davey Moore at featherweight. Cruz, who was the underdog, knocked Torres out in the first round to win the title. However, the night will be remembered more for the hospitalization and eventual death of Moore following his fight with Ramos.

For the first defence of his title Cruz returned to the Philippines to fight the American Eddie Perkins on June 15, 1963. Perkins, a former world champion, won the fight with a fifteen round points victory in front of 25,000 fans at the Rizal Baseball Stadium. The fight started badly for Cruz as he was knocked down in the opening round and badly hurt in the third and sixth rounds. Although he was able to last the distance, he was unable to retain his title and would never fight for a world championship again.

The final fight of Cruz's professional career took place on September 28, 1968 in Angeles City, Philippines, where he was knocked out in the third round by Fel Pedranza.

References

External links

Living people
Featherweight boxers
Light-welterweight boxers
World boxing champions
World Boxing Association champions
1941 births
Sportspeople from Baguio
Filipino male boxers